NGC 4725 is an intermediate barred spiral galaxy with a prominent ring structure,  located in the northern constellation of Coma Berenices near the north galactic pole. It was discovered by German-born astronomer William Herschel on April 6, 1785.

NGC 4725 is the brightest member of the Coma I Group of the Coma-Sculptor Cloud, although it is relatively isolated from the other members of this group. This galaxy is strongly disturbed and is interacting with neighboring spiral galaxy NGC 4747, with its spiral arms showing indications of warping. A tidal plume extends from NGC 4747 toward NGC 4725.

This is a suspected type 2 Seyfert galaxy with a supermassive black hole at the core. The morphological classification of this galaxy is SAB(r)ab pec, indicating a peculiar, weakly-barred spiral galaxy (SAB) with a complete ring surrounding the bar (r) and somewhat tightly-wound spiral arms (ab). It is actually double-barred, a feature found among about a third of all barred spirals. The galactic plane is inclined by approximately 46° to the line of sight from the Earth.

The ring structure of the galaxy is a region of star formation. It is offset from the galactic center and displays non-circular motion. Since there is no optical counterpart at that position, this may be a star forming region that is heavily obscured by dust.

Multiple supernova candidate events have been detected in this galaxy:

The light curve indicates this was a type II supernova.
 Candidate SN 1987E was detected April 24, 1987 with a magnitude of 15.65. A follow-up study failed to detect this event, so it may have been the result of gravitational lensing.
 SN 1999gs was detected on December 28, 1999 with a magnitude of 19.3.
Designated ASASSN-16gu (AT 2016cyu), this was most likely a supernova event. It had an estimated absolute visual magnitude of –13.6.

References

External links

 NOAO: NGC 4725
 NGC 4725
 
 NGC 4725 in Coma-Berenices

Barred spiral galaxies
Peculiar galaxies
Seyfert galaxies
Interacting galaxies
Coma I Group
Coma Berenices
4725
07989
43451